The Celeni or Cileni were an ancient Gallaecian Celtic tribe, living in the west of modern Galicia, as a civitas in the Caldas de Reis's county, with capital Aquae Celenae, which under Roman rule became a diocese and was part of the Conventus Lucensis (capital now Lugo).

See also 
 Pre-Roman peoples of the Iberian Peninsula

External links 
 Detailed map of the Pre-Roman Peoples of Iberia (around 200 BC)

Tribes of Gallaecia
Galician Celtic tribes